Moon In-soo (2 June 1945 – 7 June 2021) was a South Korean poet.

Life 

Moon In-soo was born in June 1945 in Seongju County, North Gyeongsang Province. He studied Korean literature at Dongguk University but dropped out.

Moon  began his literary career in 1985 when he published  (능수버들 A Weeping Willow) in Shimsang. He has published several poetry collections.

Moon won the 14th Daegu Literary Award in 1996, the 11th Kim Daljin Literary Prize in 2000, the 3rd Nojak Literature Prize in 2003, the 11th Poetry and Poetics Award in 2006, the 17th Pyeon-un Literature Award in 2007, and the 10th Korea Catholic Literature Award for Poetry in 2007, as well as the Midang Literary Award in the same year.

Ra Heeduk has said  that Moon In-soo's poetry is "an earnest prayer from the bottom, and a beautiful dedication to the air above."

Works

Poetry collections 
  (늪에 늪이 젖듯이 As the Swamp Becomes Wet in the Swamp), Shimsang, 1986. 
  (세상 모든 길은 집으로 간다 All Roads Lead to Home), Munhak Academy, 1990. 
  (뿔 The Horn), Minumsa, 1992. 
  (홰치는 산 The Fluttering Mountain), Maninsa, 1999.
  (동강의 높은 새 The High Bird of Donggang), Segyesa, 2000.
 Shh! (쉬!), Munhakdongne, 2006. 
  (배꼽 The Bellybutton), Changbi, 2008.
  (적막 소리 The Sound of Silence), Changbi, 2012. 
  (그립다는 말의 긴 판 Writing How I Miss You On a Long Panel), Seojeongsihak, 2012. 
  (달북), Si-indongne, 2014. 
  (나는 지금 이곳이 아니다 I'm Not Here Now), Changbi, 2015.

Children's poetry books 
  (염소 똥은 똥그랗다 Goat Poop is Round), Munhakdongne, 2010.

Awards 
 1996 14th Daegu Literary Award 
 2000 11th Kim Daljin Literary Prize 
 2003 3rd Nojak Literature Prize 
 2006 11th Poetry and Poetics Award 
 2007 10th Korea Catholic Literature Award for Poetry 
 2007 7th Midang Literary Award
 2007 17th Pyeon-un Literature Award 
 2016 9th Mogwol Literature Prize

Further reading 
 Hwang, Chibok, "Agrarian Imaginations and the Depth of Ecological Thinking", Seojeongsihak, Summer 2000. 
 Lee, Seongwu, "For Strong Lyric Poetry", Seojeongsihak, Summer 2000. 
 Lee, Sungwon, "Poetry of Travel and the Body", Blessing Within the Ruins, Cheonnyeonuisijak, 2004.
 Lee, Hyewon, "The Beauty of the Shade", Si-an, Spring 2004. 
 Kim, Yujung, "The Form of Ecological Interest in Moon In-soo's Poetry", Literature and Environment, Issue 5, 2006. 
 Gu, Mo-ryong, "The Poetry of the Boundary", In Defence of Poetry, Cheonnyeonuisijak, 2006. 
 Go, Bongjun, "Very Frustrating and Slow", Creation and Criticism, Autumn 2008.

References

External links 
 Moon In-soo's blog
 Lee, Jong-an, "Moon In-soo’s songs that somehow do not age". OhMyNews.
 Interview with Moon In-soo, winner of the Mogwol Literature Prize.

1945 births
2021 deaths
South Korean male poets
Midang Literary Award winners
People from North Gyeongsang Province
Dongguk University alumni
20th-century South Korean poets
20th-century male writers
21st-century South Korean poets
21st-century male writers